East Frankfort is a hamlet and census-designated place (CDP) in the town of Frankfort in Herkimer County, New York. It was first listed as a CDP prior to the 2020 census.

History 
The hamlet was founded in 1854 by Archibald C. McGowan and was originally known as "McGowansville".

Geography 
The community is in western Herkimer County, on the eastern edge of the town of Frankfort. It is bordered to the east by the town of German Flatts and the village of Ilion.

New York State Route 5S, a limited-access highway, forms the northern edge of the CDP, with access from Acme Road/West Main Street at the northeast corner of the community. Route 5S leads east past Ilion  to Mohawk and northwest  to Utica.

Demographics

References 

Census-designated places in Herkimer County, New York
Census-designated places in New York (state)